The Monster Cockroach, also known either as Giant Cockroach or Cock-The-Roach, also popularly known by its Russian name Tarakanishche, is a popular Russian children's fairy tale poem written by poet Korney Chukovsky in 1921. The poem was later published by Raduga Publishers in 1923 and is regarded as a cultural poetic heritage among Russophones. It tells the story of an overgrown cockroach who assumed power over mankind and animals by bullying and threatening them, only to fall prey to a sparrow in the end. The "Big Bad Cockroach" with a mustache is usually regarded as satire on Joseph Stalin, although Chukovsky might have also kept in mind Grigory Zinoviev and Leon Trotsky.

Legacy 
The poem became popular during the 2020-2021 Belarusian protests, where protesters referred to incumbent president Alexander Lukashenko as the titular insect, chanting "Stop the Cockroach". Protests in Belarus broke out before and after the disputed 2020 Belarusian presidential election, and the moment calling for the so-called Slipper Revolution, or the Anti-Cockroach Revolution, was initiated by businessman and blogger Sergei Tikhanovsky, referring to the poem. He compared Lukashenko to the cockroach. The demonstrators also called for killing the cockroach with a slipper in a metaphorical reference to the poem.

References

External links
 Cock the roach, English translation of the poem

Fictional cockroaches
Russian poems
1921 poems
Joseph Stalin